Ypsolopha vittella, the elm autumn moth, is a moth of the family Ypsolophidae. It is found from Europe through Siberia to Japan, including China, Asia Minor and mideast Asia. The habitat consists of woodlands and copses.

The wingspan is 16–20 mm. The head is light grey. Forewings pale grey or whitish-grey, sometimes brownish-mixed, sprinkled or strigulated with dark grey, sometimes more or less wholly suffused with blackish; a blackish or dark fuscous streak along dorsum, forming triangular projections upwards before and beyond middle. Hindwings are grey. The larva is brown- blackish; dorsal stripe broadly whitish. It is a variable species, with some adults showing more blackish suffusion on the dorsal region.

Adults are on wing from July to August. There is one generation per year.

The larvae feed on the leaves and flowers of Ulmus and Fagus species. They live in a slight silken web. Pupation takes place in a loose white cocoon on the trunk of the food plant or among plant debris on the ground. Other recorded food plants include Quercus, Lonicera and Acer pseudosieboldianum.

References

External links

Ypsolophidae
Moths described in 1758
Moths of Asia
Moths of Europe
Taxa named by Carl Linnaeus